Pritam Rani Siwach (born 2 October 1974) is a former captain of the Indian women's hockey team. In 2008, she was recalled to join the team for the Olympic qualifiers in order to bring an "additional wealth of experience." After the team did not qualify for the Olympics, Siwach stated in an interview, "We are not that bad as the results would show. It was simply a case of missed chances [...] One difference between my times and now is the midfield. We had an experienced midfield with Sita Gussain at the centre. That helped us. Here, both T. H. Ranjita and Rosalind Ralte are young, just come into the team. They are potential youngsters, will only improve."

She last played with the team when it won the Gold at the 2002 Commonwealth Games. She currently runs an academy and is training to become a coach.

Siwach received an Arjuna Award in 1998.

Career
Pritam was born in village Jharsa, near Gurgaon, Haryana, and started playing hockey at the age of 9. She had developed her hockey in the guidance of PTI Master Tara Chand in the school of Jharsa. Master Tara Chand and Head master Raghwendra Singh Yadav has helped her to become a best player of Hockey.

Pritam Rani Siwach is now Coach with Indian Women Hockey team for World Cup and Commonwealth Games.

Notes

External links
Biography
Commonwealth Games Biography

1974 births
Living people
Indian female field hockey players
Field hockey players at the 2002 Commonwealth Games
Commonwealth Games medallists in field hockey
Commonwealth Games gold medallists for India
Field hockey players at the 1998 Asian Games
Field hockey players at the 2002 Asian Games
Medalists at the 1998 Asian Games
Asian Games medalists in field hockey
Asian Games silver medalists for India
Recipients of the Arjuna Award
Field hockey players from Haryana
Sportswomen from Haryana
21st-century Indian women
21st-century Indian people
Medallists at the 2002 Commonwealth Games